Sophy Arabella Ridge (born 17 October 1984) is an English broadcast journalist. She currently works for Sky News and has presented Sophy Ridge on Sunday since 2017. In 2022, she launched The Take with Sophy Ridge.

Early life
Ridge was born on 17 October 1984 in Richmond upon Thames, London. Both her parents are teachers. Ridge has one younger brother. Her secondary education was at the selective grammar Tiffin Girls' School in London. During her time there, she did work experience at the local newspaper Richmond and Twickenham Times.

She continued her education at St Edmund Hall, Oxford, and obtained a second-class BA degree in English Literature. During her final year of university she did a period of work experience at the tabloid newspaper News of the World, which led to a position on their graduate training programme.

Career
She started as a voice-over artist at the voiceover agency Hobson's International, from the 1990s and 2000s along with Ciara Janson, Louise Michelle, Tom Attenborough, and Will Attenborough.

After graduation in 2006, Ridge was a trainee reporter at the now defunct tabloid newspaper News of the World. After completion of her training programmes she initially worked as a consumer affairs correspondent in 2009. She then gained a job as a political correspondent on Sky News in 2011.

During her time there she covered a broad range of political stories and travelled with the Prime Minister to Afghanistan, New York and Brazil. She was based in Colorado for the channel's coverage of the US elections and was known for her round the clock broadcasting at the annual party conferences.

Ridge covered the 2015 general election as a senior political correspondent for Sky News, reporting on the Labour Party's campaign and conducting interviews with party members. Her exclusives during this time included Ed Miliband's resignation as leader of the Labour Party following the result of that general election and Jeremy Corbyn's victory in the subsequent Labour Party leadership election.

In 2017 Ridge became the host of her own show, Sophy Ridge on Sunday. In the same year Ridge released her first book The Women Who Shaped Politics, a non-fiction book which discussed women's contribution to British politics. She also started writing a weekly column in the tabloid newspaper Metro.

Awards
Ridge won the MHP Communications 30 to Watch award (2012), and was shortlisted as Young Journalist of the Year in the Royal Television Society Awards in 2013. In 2016, she won an award for Broadcast Journalist of the Year at the Words by Women awards.

Personal life
Ridge is married to Ben Griffiths, who is a journalist for a national newspaper. She describes herself as a feminist. They have two children.

References

1984 births
Living people
Alumni of St Edmund Hall, Oxford
English feminists
People educated at the Tiffin Girls' School
Sky News newsreaders and journalists
British women journalists